Patrick Sunday (born 3 March 1975) is a Nigerian footballer who currently plays as a striker for TTM Phichit. He won one cap for the Nigerian national football team in 2000.

External links

Association football forwards
Botswana footballers
Botswana international footballers
1975 births
Living people
Botswana Defence Force XI F.C. players
Expatriate footballers in Thailand
Mogoditshane Fighters players
Sportspeople from Benin City